Saleel Wagh is a Marathi poet, philosopher based in Pune.

Biography

Saleel Wagh a leading Marathi poet, was born in 1967 in Rajkot, Gujarat. He has 7 collections of poetry on his credit. His collections include Nivadak Kavita (1996), Sadhyachya Kavita (2005), Aadhichya Kavita (2007) a Marathi translation of a major Hindi poet Shamsher Bahadur Singh (1911–1993), Blog Pahila, (a collection of critical articles on contemporary Marathi poetry), Racecourse aani Itar Kavita (2009), Junya Kavita (2010), UlatSulat (2011), Saheli Tijjan (2012), Talaleya Kavit (2018). His books Nivdak Kavita and Racecourse aani Iter Kavita left deep impact on the contemporary Marathi literature, poetry in particular. He says, "poetry is cryptology and the poet is a cryptologist  of culture". He was associated with Radical Humanist Association in the 1990s. He has been awarded ` Shabdavedh' Sanman for Marathi poetry for the year 2006. He has been also awarded prestigious 'Sahir Ludhiyanvi Sanman' in 2017 by Balraj Sahani Foundation.

Bibliography
 Poetry Collections
 Nivadak Kavita
 Aadhichya Kavita
 Sadhyachya Kavita
 Racecourse Ani Itar kavita (2008)
 Junya kavita (2010)
 Ulatsulat (2011)
 Nyari Nyari Diwangi- Saheli Tijjan (2011)
 Talalelya Kavita (2018)

 Translation
 Samsher Bahadur Singhchya Kavita

External links
at Poetry International Web
At Muse India

Online Poems
Poem No. Zero
Two poems at Museindia

References

21st-century Indian poets
Marathi-language poets
1967 births
Living people
Writers from Pune
People from Rajkot
Indian male poets
Poets from Maharashtra
21st-century Indian male writers